AFGL 2298, also known as IRAS 18576+0341, is a luminous blue variable star (LBV) located in the constellation Aquila, very close to the galactic plane. Despite being extremely luminous, it is extremely reddened by interstellar extinction, so its apparent magnitude is brighter for longer-wavelength passbands; in fact, in visual wavelengths it is completely undetectable. 

AFGL 2298 has an absolute bolometric magnitude of −11.25, making it one of the most luminous stars known. Indeed, many of the hottest and most luminous stars known are luminous blue variables and other early-type stars. However, like all LBVs, AFGL 2298 is highly variable and the bolometric magnitude refers to its peak luminosity. Its status as an LBV was confirmed in 2003.

Like most extremely massive stars, AFGL 2298 is undergoing mass loss. For example, in 2005 it was estimated to be losing  solar masses each year, although the rate of mass loss itself varies frequently and dramatically. The stellar mass is currently being ejected as a nebula around the star (similar to AG Carinae), which was imaged by the Very Large Telescope in 2010. The nebula was found to be fairly circular, and the properties of the dust appeared to be constant throughout the entire nebula.

See also
 AG Carinae
 List of most luminous stars

References

Aquila (constellation)
B-type supergiants
Luminous blue variables
Aquilae, V1672
IRAS catalogue objects
Emission-line stars
J19001089+0345471